Edward Stanley Bishop, Baron Bishopston,  (3 October 1920 – 19 April 1984) was a British Labour Party politician.

Born in Bristol, Bishop was educated at South Bristol Central School, Merchant Venturers' Technical College and Bristol University. He was an aeronautical design draughtsman. He contested Bristol West in 1950, Exeter in 1951 and South Gloucestershire in 1955.

Bishop was Member of Parliament for Newark from 1964 to 1979, when he lost the seat to the Conservative Richard Alexander.  Bishop was an assistant government whip from 1966 to 1967, and Minister for Agriculture, Fisheries and Food from 1974 to 1979.

After he lost his seat, he was created a life peer as Baron Bishopston, of Newark in the County of Nottinghamshire on 21 May 1981.

He was sworn in as a member of the Privy Council of the United Kingdom in 1977, Giving Him the Honorific Title "The Right Honourable" and after ennoblement the Post Nominal Letters "PC" for Life.

Lord Bishopston died in Devon aged 63.

Personal life 
He was married to Winifred and had four daughters: Anne, Mary, Frances and Ursula.

References

Times Guide to the House of Commons 1979

External links 

1920 births
1984 deaths
Labour Party (UK) MPs for English constituencies
Bishopston
UK MPs 1964–1966
UK MPs 1966–1970
UK MPs 1970–1974
UK MPs 1974
UK MPs 1974–1979
Members of the Privy Council of the United Kingdom
Politicians from Bristol
Alumni of the University of Bristol
Technical, Administrative and Supervisory Section-sponsored MPs
Church Estates Commissioners
Life peers created by Elizabeth II